{{DISPLAYTITLE:C5H5NO2}}
The molecular formula C5H5NO2 (molar mass: 111.10 g/mol) may refer to:

 2,6-Dihydroxypyridine
 Methyl cyanoacrylate (MCA)
 N-Methylmaleimide

Molecular formulas